Lee County is a county located in the U.S. state of North Carolina. As of the 2020 census, the population was 63,285. The county seat is Sanford. It was established on March 6, 1907, from parts of Chatham and Moore counties, and named for General Robert E. Lee, who served as the General in Chief of the Armies of the Confederate States in 1865.

Lee County comprises the Sanford Micropolitan Statistical Area, which is a part of the Fayetteville Combined Statistical Area, more commonly known as the Fayetteville area, which had a 2019 estimated population of 854,826.  Lee County's motto is "Committed Today for a Better Tomorrow".

Geography

State and local protected areas/sites
 Buckhorn Dam
 White Pines Nature Preserve (part)

Major water bodies

 Big Governors Creek
 Cape Fear River
 Cypress Creek
 Deep River
 Juniper Creek (Cape Fear River tributary)
 Lake Trace
 Lake Villanow
 Lick Creek
 Little Buffalo Creek (Deep River tributary)
 Little Governors Creek
 Little Pocket Creek
 Pocket Creek (Deep River tributary)
 Roberts Creek

Adjacent counties
 Chatham County - north
 Harnett County - southeast
 Moore County - southwest

Major highways
  (Concurrency with US 421)

Major infrastructure
 Raleigh Executive Jetport

Demographics

2020 census

As of the 2020 United States census, there were 63,285 people, 21,894 households, and 15,223 families residing in the county.

2000 census
As of the census of 2000, there were 49,040 people, 18,466 households, and 13,369 families residing in the county.  The population density was 191 people per square mile (74/km2).  There were 19,909 housing units at an average density of 77 per square mile (30/km2).  The racial makeup of the county was 70.03% White, 20.46% Black or African American, 0.42% Native American, 0.67% Asian, 0.04% Pacific Islander, 7.33% from other races, and 1.06% from two or more races.  11.65% of the population were Hispanic or Latino of any race. By 2005 14.2% of the County population was Latino.  20.2% of the population was African-American.  64.2% of the population was non-Hispanic whites.

In 2000 there were 18,466 households, out of which 33.30% had children under the age of 18 living with them, 54.30% were married couples living together, 13.40% had a female householder with no husband present, and 27.60% were non-families. 23.50% of all households were made up of individuals, and 8.80% had someone living alone who was 65 years of age or older.  The average household size was 2.61 and the average family size was 3.05. In the county, the population was spread out, with 25.70% under the age of 18, 9.00% from 18 to 24, 29.70% from 25 to 44, 22.70% from 45 to 64, and 12.90% who were 65 years of age or older. The median age was 36 years. For every 100 females there were 97.50 males.  For every 100 females age 18 and over, there were 95.00 males. The median income for a household in the county was $38,900, and the median income for a family was $45,373. Males had a median income of $32,780 versus $23,660 for females. The per capita income for the county was $19,147.  About 9.80% of families and 12.80% of the population were below the poverty line, including 16.50% of those under age 18 and 12.20% of those age 65 or over.

Government and politics
Lee is a typical "Solid South" county in terms of voting patterns. From its first election in 1908 it voted Democratic by large margins until 1968, except in the 1928 election when anti-Prohibition Catholic Al Smith held the county by single digits. In 1968, Lee's Democratic streak was broken when its electorate chose the American Independent candidate George Wallace. After 1972, Lee has voted Republican in every election except for Jimmy Carter's two elections in 1976 and 1980.

Lee County is a member of the regional Triangle J Council of Governments. The county is governed by a seven-member board of County Commissioners, elected at large to serve four-year terms. Terms are staggered so that, every two years, three or four Commissioners are up for election. The Commissioners enact policies such as establishment of the property tax rate, regulation of land use and zoning outside municipal jurisdictions, and adoption of the annual budget. Commissioners usually meet on the first and third Mondays of each month.

Communities

City
 Sanford (county seat and largest city)

Town
 Broadway

Unincorporated communities
 Blacknel
 Colon
 Cumnock
 Lemon Springs
 Murchisontown
 Osgood
 Pocket
 Swann Station
 Tramway
 White Hill

Townships
The county is divided into seven townships, which are both numbered and named:

 1 (Greenwood)
 2 (Jonesboro)
 3 (Cape Fear)
 4 (Deep River)
 5 (East Sanford)
 6 (West Sanford)
 7 (Pocket)

Trivia
 The area has historically been one of the leading brick manufacturing areas in the United States.
 Cotton and tobacco are leading crops in the county.
 The county is divided between the Piedmont in the northern part of the county and the Sandhills in the south.
 Lee County sits in the middle of the Triassic Basin and has the state's most concentrated reserves of oil and natural gas.
 Lee County is also home to the longest covered bridge in North Carolina found along NC-42 near Ole Gilliam Mill Park.

See also
 List of counties in North Carolina
 National Register of Historic Places listings in Lee County, North Carolina
 List of memorials to Robert E. Lee
 List of future Interstate Highways

References

External links

 
 
 NCGenWeb Lee County - free genealogy resources for the county

 
Lee County
Lee County, North Carolina